Bruce E. Sands is an American gastroenterologist, focusing in colonoscopy, Crohn's disease, inflammatory bowl disease, ulcerative colitis and upper GI endoscopy, currently the Dr. Burrill B. Crohn Professor of Medicine at Mount Sinai School of Medicine and is an Elected Fellow of the American College of Gastroenterology and American Gastroenterological Association.

References

Icahn School of Medicine at Mount Sinai faculty
American gastroenterologists
Living people
Fellows of the American Gastroenterological Association
Year of birth missing (living people)